Haskell Wexler, ASC (February 6, 1922 – December 27, 2015) was an American cinematographer, film producer, and director. Wexler was judged to be one of film history's ten most influential cinematographers in a survey of the members of the International Cinematographers Guild.  He won the Academy Award for Best Cinematography twice, in 1966 and 1976, out of five nominations. In his obituary in The New York Times, Wexler is described as being "renowned as one of the most inventive cinematographers in Hollywood."

Early life and education
Wexler was born to a Jewish family in Chicago in 1922. His parents were Simon and Lottie Wexler, whose children included Jerrold, Joyce (Isaacs) and Yale. He attended the progressive Francis Parker School, where he was best friends with Barney Rosset.

After a year of college at the University of California, Berkeley, he volunteered as a seaman in the Merchant Marine in 1941, as the U.S. was preparing to enter World War II. He became friends with fellow sailor Woody Guthrie, who later gained fame as a folk singer. While in the Merchant Marine, Wexler advocated for the desegregation of seamen. In November 1942, his ship was torpedoed by a German submarine and sank off the coast of South Africa. He spent 10 days on a lifeboat before being rescued. After the war, Wexler received the Silver Star and was promoted to the rank of second officer.

He returned to Chicago after his discharge in 1946 and began working in the stockroom at his father's company, Allied Radio. He decided he wanted to become a filmmaker, although he had no experience, and his father helped him set up a small studio in Des Plaines, Illinois. He began by shooting industrial films at Midwest factories. When his studio lost too much money, it was eventually shut down, but the business served as an unofficial film school for Wexler.

He later took freelance jobs as a cameraman, joining the International Photographers Guild in 1947. He worked his way up to more technical positions after beginning as an assistant cameraman on various projects. He made a number of documentaries, including The Living City, which was nominated for an Academy Award.

Film career
Wexler briefly made industrial films in Chicago, then in 1947 became an assistant cameraman. Wexler worked on documentary features and shorts; low-budget docu-dramas such as 1959's The Savage Eye, television's The Adventures of Ozzie and Harriet and TV commercials (he would later found Wexler-Hall, a television commercial production company, with Conrad Hall).  He made ten documentary films with director Saul Landau, including Paul Jacobs and the Nuclear Gang, which aired on PBS and won an Emmy Award and a George Polk Award. Other notable documentaries shot and co-directed (with Landau) by Wexler included Brazil: A Report on Torture and The CIA Case Officer and The Sixth Sun: A Mayan Uprising in Chiapas.

In 1963 Wexler self-funded, produced and photographed the documentary The Bus in which a group of Freedom Riders are followed as they make their way from San Francisco to Washington D.C. That same year he served as the cinematographer on his first big-budget film, Elia Kazan's America America. Kazan was nominated for a Best Director Academy Award.  Wexler worked steadily in Hollywood thereafter. George Lucas, then 20, met Wexler who shared his hobby of auto racing. Wexler pulled a few strings to help Lucas get admitted to the USC Film School. Wexler would later work with Lucas as a consultant for American Graffiti (1973).

Wexler was cinematographer of Mike Nichols' screen version of Who's Afraid of Virginia Woolf? (1966), for which he won the last Academy Award for Best Cinematography (Black & White) handed out. The following year had Wexler as the cinematographer for the Oscar-winning detective drama, In the Heat of the Night (1967), starring Sidney Poitier. His work was notable for being the first major film in Hollywood history to be shot in color with proper consideration for a person of African descent. Wexler recognized that standard lighting tended to produce too much glare on that kind of dark complexion making the actors look bad. Accordingly, Wexler toned it down to feature Poitier with better photographic results.

Wexler was fired as cinematographer during filming of Francis Ford Coppola's The Conversation and replaced by Bill Butler. He was also fired from Miloš Forman's 1975 film One Flew Over the Cuckoo's Nest and again replaced by Bill Butler. Wexler believed his dismissal on Cuckoo's Nest was due to his radical left political views as highlighted by his concurrent work on the documentary Underground, in which the left-wing urban guerrilla group The Weather Underground were being interviewed while hiding from the law. However, Forman said he had terminated Wexler over mere artistic differences. Both Wexler and Butler received Academy Award nominations for Best Cinematography for One Flew Over the Cuckoo's Nest, though Wexler said there was "only about a minute or two minutes in that film I didn't shoot.”

However, he won a second Oscar for Bound for Glory (1976), a biography of Woody Guthrie, whom Wexler had met during his time in the Merchant Marine. Bound for Glory was the first feature film to make use of the newly invented Steadicam, in a famous sequence that also incorporated a crane shot. Wexler was also credited as additional cinematographer on Days of Heaven (1978), which won a Best Cinematography Oscar for Néstor Almendros. Wexler was featured on the soundtrack of the film Underground (1976), recorded on Folkways Records in 1976.

He worked on documentaries throughout his career. The documentary Paul Jacobs and the Nuclear Gang (1980) earned an Emmy Award; Interviews with My Lai Veterans (1970) won an Academy Award. His later documentaries included; Bus Riders' Union (2000), about the modernization and expansion of bus services in Los Angeles by the organization and its founder Eric Mann, Who Needs Sleep? (2006), the Independent Lens documentary Good Kurds, Bad Kurds: No Friends But the Mountains (2000), Tell Them Who You Are (2004) Bringing King to China (2011), and From Wounded Knee to Standing Rock: A Reporter's Journey (2019).

Wexler also directed fictional movies. Medium Cool (1969), a film written by Wexler and shot in a cinéma vérité style, is studied by film students all over the world for its breakthrough form. It influenced more than a generation of filmmakers. In DVD commentary for Criterion Collection, Wexler recalled that the studio execs were flabbergasted the film, "an edgy, Godardian tale that ricocheted from one hot-button topic to the next (poverty, racism, civil rebellion, the war in Vietnam, the Kennedy and King assassinations)." The making of Medium Cool was the subject of a BBC documentary by Paul Cronin, Look Out Haskell, It's Real: The Making of Medium Cool (2001). "Medium Cool" was selected for preservation in the National Film Registry in 2003.

Produced by Lucasfilm, Wexler's film Latino (1985) was chosen for the 1985 Cannes Film Festival. He both wrote and directed the work. Another directing project was From Wharf Rats to Lords of the Docks (2007), an intimate exploration of the life and times of Harry Bridges, an extraordinary labor leader and social visionary described as "a hero or the devil incarnate--it all depends on your point of view."

In 1988, Wexler won the Independent Spirit Award for Best Cinematography for the John Sayles film Matewan (1987), for which he was also nominated for an Academy Award. His work with Billy Crystal in the HBO film 61* (2001) was nominated for an Emmy.

In 2021, filmmakers Joan Churchill and Alan Barker released a 26-minute documentary, Shoot From the Heart, about Wexler's life and career. Churchill described her intention in making the film this way: “We were making a film about a man who was a passionate activist, who never gave up hope for the world.”

A "lifelong liberal activist," during the final years of his life, Wexler trained his focus on raising awareness of sleep deprivation and long hours in the film industry, culminating in the documentary Who Needs Sleep? (2006), which "examined the routine overworking of Hollywood film crews." In a first-person article in HuffPost, Wexler wrote, "There's nothing I love more than making films. But the health of my fellow film workers and citizens is more important than anything on the silver screen."

Personal life 
Wexler married the American actress Rita Taggart in 1989. He had two sons, four grandchildren; and one great-granddaughter.

Death
Wexler died in his sleep at the age of 93 on December 27, 2015, at his home in Santa Monica, California.

Legacy and honors (career awards)
 In 1993, Wexler won a Lifetime Achievement Award from the American Society of Cinematographers, the first active cameraman to be awarded.
 In 1996, he was awarded a star on the Hollywood Walk of Fame, the first cinematographer in 35 years to be so honored.
 In 2004, Wexler was the subject of a documentary, Tell Them Who You Are, directed by his son, Mark Wexler.
 In 2007, he received a Lifetime Achievement Award from the Independent Documentary Association and the same from the Society of Operating Cameramen.
 In 2014, the Location Managers Guild of America awarded Wexler the Humanitarian Award at its inaugural awards show. 
 Six of the films he worked on have been preserved by the National Film Registry for being "culturally, historically, or aesthetically significant": Who's Afraid of Virginia Woolf (inducted in 2013), Days of Heaven (2007), Medium Cool (2003), In the Heat of the Night (2002), American Graffiti (1995) and One Flew Over the Cuckoo's Nest (1993).
 In September 2016, George Lucas created the Haskell Wexler Endowed Chair in Documentary at the USC School of Cinematic Arts. The first holder of the Wexler Chair is Michael Renov, Vice Dean of Academic Affairs at SCA and a professor in the Bryan Singer Division of Cinema & Media Studies.

Selected filmography

 Stakeout on Dope Street, 1958 (Wexler is credited under the pseudonym of Mark Jeffrey due to problems with his Guild membership) 
 The Savage Eye, 1960
 Hoodlum Priest, 1961
 Angel Baby, 1961
 Face in the Rain, 1963
 America America, 1963
 The Best Man, 1964
 The Loved One, 1965 (also producer)
 Who's Afraid of Virginia Woolf?, 1966
 In the Heat of the Night, 1967
 The Thomas Crown Affair, 1968
 Medium Cool, 1969 (also director and screenwriter)
 American Graffiti, 1973 (as "visual consultant")
 Introduction to the Enemy, 1974 (also director)
 One Flew Over the Cuckoo's Nest, 1975 (replaced by Bill Butler)
 Underground, 1976 (also co-director)
 Bound for Glory, 1976
 Coming Home, 1978
 Days of Heaven, 1978
 Second-Hand Hearts, 1981
 Lookin' to Get Out, 1982
 The Man Who Loved Women, 1983
Latino, 1985 (also director and screenwriter)
 Matewan, 1987
 Colors, 1988
 Three Fugitives, 1989
 Blaze, 1989
 Other People's Money, 1991
 The Babe, 1992
 The Secret of Roan Inish, 1994
 Canadian Bacon, 1995
 Mulholland Falls, 1996
 The Rich Man's Wife, 1996
 Limbo, 1999
 61*, 2001
 Silver City, 2004
 The Writer with No Hands, 2014 (appearance as self)
 Who Needs Sleep?, 2006 (director and director of photography)

Frequent collaborators
Hal Ashby
Norman Jewison
John Sayles
Saul Landau

References

External links

 
 
 A documentary about Wexler's 1969 film Medium Cool
 Haskell Wexler, ASC, Focuses on the Making of Matewan
 John Patterson, "Through a lens darkly", The Guardian, interview, 2 June 2006
 Underground Album Details at Smithsonian Folkways
 Video interview of Wexler about the film Medium Cool
 Haskell Wexler Dead at 93: Legendary Cinematographer, Activist Captured the Struggles of Our Times, Democracy Now!, 28 December 2015
 Radio interview with Haskell Wexler on Fresh Air (17 mins, 1993)

1922 births
2015 deaths
21st-century American Jews
American cinematographers
American film directors
American male screenwriters
American military personnel of World War II
American sailors
Best Cinematographer Academy Award winners
Independent Spirit Award winners
Jewish American military personnel
Military personnel from Illinois
Shipwreck survivors
United States Merchant Mariners
United States Merchant Mariners of World War II
University of California, Berkeley alumni
Francis W. Parker School (Chicago) alumni